Mead Howard "Robert" Horton Jr. (July 29, 1924 – March 9, 2016) was an American actor and singer. He is known for playing Flint McCullough in Wagon Train (1957–1962).

Early life
One of two sons, Mead Howard Horton Jr. was born on July 29, 1924, in Los Angeles, California. His parents were Mead Howard Horton Sr. and Chelta McMurrin.

Horton said that he never felt he fitted into his proper Latter-day Saint household because at times he was rather impetuous. He survived several surgeries in childhood, including hernia repair and treatment for an enlarged kidney. Horton attended California Military Institute in Perris, where he played football. After graduation in 1943 at age 19, he enlisted in the Coast Guard, but was medically discharged because of his kidney.

In 1945, a chance encounter with a talent scout led to an uncredited part in Lewis Milestone's film A Walk in the Sun (1945). He first studied dramatics at the University of Miami but later changed schools and graduated cum laude from UCLA.

Career
Horton's experience on stage included work with the American Theatre Wing in New York City, where he was the "resident leading man". From that, he was signed to a contract with MGM Studios, where he "appeared in numerous films." His "first major TV role" was in Ford Theatre in the episode "Portrait of Lydia" on December 16, 1954.

In his six decades of television, Horton, who became known for his voice, was most noted for his role as the frontier scout Flint McCullough in the television series Wagon Train from 1957 to 1962. His co-stars were Ward Bond, John McIntire, Terry Wilson, and Frank McGrath. He eventually quit the series to pursue a career in musical theater.

His role on Wagon Train was taken by Robert Fuller as the scout Cooper Smith. Fuller, a veteran of the western series Laramie, resembled Horton, and the two actors coincidentally shared the same birthday, albeit nine years apart.

Horton played Drake McHugh, Ronald Reagan's role in the television version of Kings Row (1955), which featured Jack Kelly, and ran for seven episodes as part of the Warner Bros. Presents series, rotating with a television version of Casablanca and Cheyenne, starring Clint Walker.

The ruggedly handsome Horton made dozens of appearances in movies and television shows between 1951 and 1989, including a small role in the film Bright Road starring Dorothy Dandridge, an episode of Ray Milland's sitcom Meet Mr. McNutley and on the syndicated Sheriff of Cochise, starring John Bromfield. Horton played Corporal Tom Vaughn in an episode "False Prophet" (1956) on Crossroads.

Horton appeared on seven episodes of Alfred Hitchcock Presents, including memorably as a tennis-playing insurance investigator and blackmailer opposite Betsy von Furstenberg in "The Disappearing Trick", directed by Arthur Hiller. He was cast as Danny Barnes in the episode "No Place to Hide" of theThe DuPont Show with June Allyson as well as appeared on the interview program Here's Hollywood and NBC's anthology series The Barbara Stanwyck Show. He appeared several times on The Ford Show, Starring Tennessee Ernie Ford.

In the 1960s, Horton made two 45 RPM singles on the Columbia Records label: "The Very Thought of You"/"Hey There" and "King of the Road"/"Julie". The former's A-side was also the title track of an album he released on the same label.

Horton performed for many years in theaters and nightclubs all over America, and in Australia as a singer (sometimes with his wife, the former Marilynn Bradley). In 1963, producer David Merrick hired him as the male lead in the musical version of N. Richard Nash's play The Rainmaker (titled 110 in the Shade),. The musical, with a score by Tom Jones and Harvey Schmidt, ran for 330 performances on Broadway.

Horton is also remembered for his offbeat role as an amnesiac in the 1965–1966 television series A Man Called Shenandoah.

In 1966, he starred in The Dangerous Days of Kiowa Jones, the first Western made specifically for television and simultaneous distribution to cinemas in Europe. It was made by MGM and co-starred Sal Mineo and Diane Baker.

In 1968, two years later, Horton co-starred in The Green Slime, a low-budget Japanese-American science fiction film, directed by Kinji Fukasaku and shot entirely in Japan, but with an American and European cast. His character Jack Rankin leads the crew of a space station in a battle for survival against one-eyed tentacled aliens that rapidly multiply as they feed on the station's sources of electricity.

From 1983 to 1984, Horton took a turn in daytime soap operas, playing the part of Whit McColl on As the World Turns.

Personal life
Horton was an accomplished pilot and aircraft owner. According to Plane and Pilot: 

"His three greatest thrills were his first solo flight, a performance before Queen Elizabeth II, and being featured on Ralph Edwards' This Is Your Life. His frequent co-pilot was his French Poodle, "Jamie".

Initially a Republican, he supported the campaign of Dwight Eisenhower during the 1952 presidential election.

Marriages
Horton married actress Barbara Ruick on August 22, 1953, in Las Vegas, Nevada.

On December 31, 1960, Horton married actress Marilynn Bradley, who limited her professional appearances on stage to performing with him. Horton and his wife lived in Encino, California in the same home for 55 years, until 2015. Following his 85th birthday in 2009, Horton announced, through his publicist, that he no longer would be making any personal appearances because he had tired of traveling.

Awards
He was the recipient of several lifetime achievement awards for television, including the Golden Boot in 2004, and also the Cowboy Spirit Award at the National Festival of the West. On his 90th birthday, he received the Western Legend Award.

Death
Horton died of natural causes on March 9, 2016, at the age of 91 in a rehabilitation clinic in Los Angeles, California.

Filmography

References

External links

 
 
 Official site
 Obituary – Playbill
 Obituary – New York Times

1924 births
2016 deaths
20th-century American male actors
American Latter Day Saints
American male film actors
American male musical theatre actors
American male stage actors
American male television actors
California Republicans
Male actors from Los Angeles
Male Western (genre) film actors
United States Coast Guard personnel of World War II
Western (genre) television actors